Wegert was an electricals company in Germany which specialized in white goods. Latterly, Wegert was a wholly owned subsidiary of Kesa Electricals plc, although most of its lifespan was spent in Kingfisher plc. The stores were closed down in 2003 due to declining sales.

Electronics companies of Germany
Retail companies of Germany
Retail companies disestablished in 2003
Entertainment companies of Germany
Defunct companies of Germany